Keith Elmore "Pinky" Christensen (May 10, 1947 – February 17, 2023) was a college and professional football player in the United States.  Christensen played at offensive tackle at the University of Kansas where he was coached first by Jack Mitchell and later by Pepper Rodgers.  

Christensen was drafted by the New Orleans Saints in the fifth round of the 1969 NFL Draft.  He was the 117th player drafted overall.  He then went to the Edmonton Eskimos where he played for the 1970 and 1971 seasons.

He married Jane M McConahey on August 3, 1968.  After his retirement from professional football, he returned to his hometown of Concordia, Kansas, where he played high school football at Concordia Junior-Senior High School.

References

1947 births
2023 deaths
Edmonton Elks players
Kansas Jayhawks football players
People from Concordia, Kansas